The 1960 PGA Championship was the 42nd PGA Championship, played July 21–24 at the South Course of Firestone Country Club in Akron, Ohio. Jay Hebert won his only major championship, one stroke ahead of runner-up Jim Ferrier, the 1947  Only one player broke par in the final round; Wes Ellis shot 69 (−1) and finished in sixth place. Hebert's younger brother Lionel won the title in 1957, the last PGA Championship contested in match play format.

Third round leader Doug Sanders shot 73 (+3) on Sunday and finished two strokes back in a tie for third. Arnold Palmer, reigning champion of the Masters and U.S. Open, carded a triple-bogey eight on the 16th hole on Saturday, and finished five strokes back.

Palmer was attempting to win a third major in 1960; in addition to his wins at the Masters and U.S. Open, he was runner-up by a stroke at the British Open at St Andrews. At Firestone, Palmer opened with a 67 for the first round  but fell off the pace late on Saturday and tied for seventh; he won seven majors but never a PGA Championship. Through 2017, no player has won all three U.S. majors (Masters, U.S. Open, PGA) in the same calendar year.

Two-time champion Ben Hogan played in the PGA Championship for the first time since his match play victory in 1948.

Attendance figures were 14,141 for Sunday's final round, with a four-day total of 53,509.

This was the first of three PGA Championships at the South Course, which later hosted in 1966 and 1975. It is the current venue for the WGC-Bridgestone Invitational, which began in 1976 as the World Series of Golf on the PGA Tour. The American Golf Classic was held at Firestone 's south course from 1961 to 1975.

Course layout

South Course

Round summaries

First round
Thursday, July 21, 1960

Source:

Second round
Friday, July 22, 1960

Source:

Third round
Saturday, July 23, 1960

Source:

Final round
Sunday, July 24, 1960

References

External links
GolfCompendium.com – 1960 PGA Championship
PGA.com – 1960 PGA Championship

PGA Championship
Golf in Ohio
Sports competitions in Ohio
Sports in Akron, Ohio
PGA Championship
PGA Championship
PGA Championship
PGA Championship